Paziella tanaoa is a species of sea snail, a marine gastropod mollusk in the family Muricidae, the murex snails or rock snails.

Description
The length of the shell attains 8.2 mm.

Distribution
This marine species is found off the Marquesas Islands.

References

 Merle D., Garrigues B. & Pointier J.-P. (2011) Fossil and Recent Muricidae of the world. Part Muricinae. Hackenheim: Conchbooks. 648 pp. page(s): 169

External links
 Houart, R. & Tröndlé, J. (2008). Update of Muricidae (excluding Coralliophilinae) from French Polynesia with description of ten new species. Novapex. 9 (2-3): 53-93

Muricidae
Gastropods described in 2008